Las Danaides is a fountain and sculpture in Mexico City's Alameda Central, in Mexico. The statue depicts two women representing the 50 daughters of Danaus (Danaïdes).

References

External links

 

Alameda Central
Danaids
Fountains in Mexico
Outdoor sculptures in Mexico City
Sculptures of mythology
Sculptures of women in Mexico
Statues in Mexico City